Seychelles competed at the 2019 World Aquatics Championships in Gwangju, South Korea from 12 to 28 July.

Open water swimming

Seychelles qualified four male and one female open water swimmers.

Men

Women

Swimming

Seychelles entered four swimmers.

Men

Women

Mixed

References

World Aquatics Championships
Nations at the 2019 World Aquatics Championships
2019